USS Cassin Young (DD-793) is a  of the U.S. Navy named for Captain Cassin Young (1894–1942), who was awarded the Medal of Honor for his heroism at the Japanese attack on Pearl Harbor and killed in the Naval Battle of Guadalcanal in the fall of 1942.

Cassin Young (DD-793) was launched 12 September 1943 by Bethlehem Shipbuilding, San Pedro, California; sponsored by Mrs. Eleanor Young; and commissioned on 31 December 1943.

After serving in World War II, including the Battle of Leyte Gulf and the Battle of Okinawa, Cassin Young was decommissioned, but was reactivated during the Korean War and continued in active service until 1960. She was designated a National Historic Landmark in 1986 as one of only four surviving Fletcher-class destroyers still afloat.

The USS Cassin Young can now be visited seasonally free of charge in the Boston Navy Yard at Boston National Historical Park.

Service history

1944
Cassin Young arrived at Pearl Harbor 19 March 1944 to complete her training before sailing on to Manus, where she joined the massive Fast Carrier Task Force (then called TF 58, at other times called TF 38, depending on whether the overall organization was called 5th Fleet or 3rd Fleet). On 28 April, this force sortied for air attacks on Japanese strongholds at Truk, Woleai, Satawan, and Ponape, during which Cassin Young operated as a picket ship, assigned to warn her group of possible enemy counterattack.

She returned to Majuro, and then Pearl Harbor for further training before reporting to Eniwetok on 11 June to join the screen of escort carriers assigned to covering duty in the invasion of Saipan four days later. In addition to radar picket and screening duty, she was also called upon for inshore fire support. As the battle for Saipan raged ashore, escort carriers of Cassin Youngs group launched attacks on the island, as well as sorties to neutralize enemy air fields on Tinian, Rota, and Guam. Similar operations supporting the subsequent assaults on Tinian and Guam claimed the services of Cassin Young until 13 August, when she returned to Eniwetok to replenish.

Between 29 August and 2 October 1944, Cassin Young guarded the carriers of Task Group 38.3 as strikes were flown from their decks to hit targets on Palau, Mindanao, and Luzon in support of the assault on the Palaus, stepping-stone to the Philippines. Only four days after her return from this mission to Ulithi, Cassin Young sailed on 6 October with the same force on duty in the accelerated schedule for the Philippines assault. First on the schedule were air strikes on Okinawa, Luzon, and Formosa; these led to the furious Formosa Air Battle of 10 to 13 October, during which the Japanese tried to destroy the carrier strength of the imposing TF 38. On 14 October, the cruiser  was struck by a kamikaze, which wounded five of Cassin Youngs men with machine gun fire. Cassin Young aided in shooting down several aircraft in this attack.

On 18 October 1944, TF 38 took position east of Luzon to launch strikes immobilizing enemy air fields there in preparation for the assault on Leyte two days later. After standing by to render support if called upon during the initial landings, Cassin Youngs group began to search for the enemy forces known to be moving toward Leyte Gulf on 23 October, and next day moved in toward San Bernardino Strait, ready to launch strikes. In the most vigorous and successful air attack mounted by the Japanese during the Leyte operation, at 09:38 on 24 October, an enemy bomb struck the aircraft carrier , and Cassin Young rejoined TG 38.3 for the dash northward to attack the Japanese Northern Force. This developed on 25 October into the Battle off Cape Engaño, a series of air strikes in which four Japanese carriers and a destroyer were sunk.

1945
Cassin Young continued operations in support of the Leyte conquest, as her carriers continued to range widely, striking at enemy bases on Okinawa, Formosa, and Luzon. With Ulithi as her base, the destroyer screened carriers during the January 1945 South China Sea raid as their aircraft pounded away at Formosa, Luzon, Camranh Bay, Hong Kong, Canton, and the Nansei Shoto in their support for the assault on Luzon. A brief overhaul at Ulithi prepared her for the operations supporting the invasion of Iwo Jima with air strikes on Honshū and Okinawa, the bombardment of Parece Vela, and screening off Iwo Jima itself during the initial assault on 19 February.

Okinawa
Cassin Young returned to Ulithi, where saw was attached to Task Force 54 (TF 54)
for the invasion of Okinawa, for which she sailed from Ulithi 22 March 1945. After screening heavy ships in the massive pre-invasion bombardment, Cassin Young moved inshore to support the activities of underwater demolition teams preparing the beaches. On invasion day itself, 1 April, the destroyer offered fire support in the assault areas, then took up radar picket duty. As the Japanese air arm had been decimated by this point in the war, the lack of trained and experienced pilots led to its most extensive deployment of kamikaze attacks during this battle; on 6 April, Cassin Young experienced her first kamikaze action, rescuing the survivors of two nearby destroyers that were sunk.

12 April Kamikaze damage
On 12 April, a massive wave of kamikazes came in at midday. Cassin Youngs accurate gunfire had aided in shooting down five aircraft, but a sixth crashed high-up into her foremast, exploding in midair only  from the ship. Surprisingly only one man was killed, TM3cT Robert Dean "Bobby" Moore, 19, of Enid, Oklahoma. 58 were wounded, many seriously. Cassin Young, although damaged, made it to Kerama Retto under her own power. After repairs there and at Ulithi, she returned to Okinawa on 31 May, and resumed radar picket duty.

29 July Kamikaze strike
As the kamikaze attacks continued, Cassin Young had respite only during two brief convoy escort voyages to the Marianas. On 28 July, her group was again a prime target for the Japanese, with one destroyer sunk and another badly damaged by kamikazes. During the engagement, Cassin Young assisted in shooting down two enemy aircraft, and rescued survivors from the sunken ship. The next day, she was struck for the second time, when a low-flying aircraft hit her starboard side, striking her fire control room. A tremendous explosion amidships was followed by fire, but the crew managed to restore power to one engine, get the flames under control, and had the ship underway for the safety of Kerama Retto within 20 minutes. Twenty-two men were killed and 45 wounded. For her determined service and gallantry in the Okinawa radar picket line she was awarded the Navy Unit Commendation.

1946
Cassin Young cleared Okinawa 8 August and headed home for repairs. Arriving home in San Pedro, California she was fully repaired, and then decommissioned and placed in reserve in San Diego on 28 May 1946.

1951–1960
Recommissioned 8 September 1951, she cleared San Diego on 4 January 1952 for her new home port, Newport, Rhode Island. In September 1952 she entered Dry Dock #1 in the Boston Navy Yard for the first of four major overhauls she would undergo in this shipyard. At this time the ship was updated to its current configuration. Two Hedgehog anti-submarine (ASW) launchers and two torpedo carriages for the Mark 32 torpedo were added, with one 21 inch (533 mm) quintuple torpedo tube mount removed. Also, four 40 mm Bofors twin mounts were replaced by two quadruple mounts. The forward pole mast was replaced by a tripod mast to accommodate improved radar and electronics systems. Local operations and refresher training in the Caribbean preceded a period of antisubmarine exercises off Florida from 7 May to 12 June 1953. Her first tour of duty with the 6th Fleet in the Mediterranean took place from 16 September to 30 November 1953. After another period of local operations, and exercises in the Caribbean Sea early in 1954, she cleared Newport on 3 May for a round-the-world cruise, which included exercises with the 7th Fleet in the western Pacific, patrols off Korea, and good-will visits to Far Eastern and Mediterranean ports. She returned to Newport on 28 November 1954. Her operations from that time until 1960 included training exercises in the Caribbean and off the eastern seaboard as well as tours of duty in the Mediterranean in 1956, winter 1956-57, and 1959, and a round of visits to ports of northern Europe in 1958. During that last overseas deployment an issue was discovered with her rudder that put her into dry dock in France. At that point the repair costs outweighed retaining the aging ship. Consequently, on 6 February 1960 she arrived at Norfolk Naval Shipyard to be decommissioned. The ship was put into long-term storage at the Philadelphia Naval Inactive Ship Maintenance Facility 29 April 1960.

1974–present
Cassin Young was struck from the Naval Vessel Register on 1 December 1974. She arrived on 15 June 1978 and was opened to the public in 1981. The ship is maintained and operated by the National Park Service and Cassin Young Volunteers. She was listed on the National Register of Historic Places and designated a National Historic Landmark in 1986, as a well-preserved example of the Fletcher-class destroyer, the most numerous class of destroyer produced by the United States during World War II.

In late July 2010, Cassin Young closed to the public in preparation for dry-docking. On 9 August 2010, she was moved into Historic Dry Dock #1 in BNHP for the first time in 30 years for some much needed repairs to her hull. On 4 September 2012, the ship was closed to the public to allow contractors to make final repairs to the hull. She returned to her position at Pier 1 on 14 May 2013. On 4 June 2013, she was moved to the Boston Harbor Shipyard and Marina in East Boston while repairs were made to her berth in Charlestown. By September 2013, she had returned to her museum berth.

Three other Fletcher-class ships are preserved as memorials:

  at Buffalo, New York
  at Baton Rouge, Louisiana
 , former , at Thessaloniki, Greece

Awards

 Navy Unit Commendation 
 Asiatic-Pacific Campaign Medal with seven battle stars 
 World War II Victory Medal 
 Navy Occupation Medal with "EUROPE" clasp
 China Service Medal
 National Defense Service Medal
 Korean Service Medal
 Philippine Presidential Unit Citation
 Korean Presidential Unit Citation
 Philippine Liberation Medal with two stars
 United Nations Service Medal
 Korean War Service Medal

Gallery

See also
Boston National Historical Park
List of National Historic Landmarks in Boston
National Register of Historic Places listings in northern Boston, Massachusetts

References

Bibliography

External links

DD 793: USS Cassin Young

hazegray.org: USS Cassin Young
Historic Naval Ships Association: USS Cassin Young (DD-793)

 

World War II destroyers of the United States
Cold War destroyers of the United States
Museum ships in Massachusetts
National Historic Landmarks in Boston
Ships built in Los Angeles
1943 ships
Military and war museums in Massachusetts
Fletcher-class destroyers of the United States Navy
Museums in Boston
Ships on the National Register of Historic Places in Massachusetts
Boston National Historical Park
National Register of Historic Places in Boston